The 180th Airlift Squadron (180 AS) is a unit of the Missouri Air National Guard 139th Airlift Wing located at Rosecrans Air National Guard Base, St. Joseph, Missouri. The 180th is equipped with the C-130H2 Hercules.

History

World War II 
The squadron was constituted on 19 June 1942 during World War II as the 438th Bombardment Squadron (Medium), and was activated on 26 June at Barksdale Field, assigned to the 319th Bombardment Group, equipped with the Martin B-26 Marauder medium bomber. After training with the group under the Third Air Force in Louisiana, it was sent to the Mediterranean Theater of Operations through England, where it was based between September and October. The ground echelon of the squadron landed at Arzew, Algeria during Operation Torch, the Allied invasion of North Africa, on 8 November. In Algeria, the group became part of the Twelfth Air Force; the squadron was based at Saint-Leu Airfield around 10 November, moving to Tafaraoui Airfield on 17 November, Maison Blanche Airport around 26 November, and Telergma Airport on 13 December. It flew its first combat mission of the North African Campaign on 28 November, engaging in raids on Axis airdromes, harbors, railroads, and shipping off the North African coast among other targets until 13 February 1943.

The 438th was withdrawn with the group to French Morocco between 27 February and 31 May for reorganization and re-equipping, being based at Oujda Airfield from 3 March and Rabat–Salé Airport from 25 April. After moving forward to Sedrata Airfield, Algeria, on 1 June, it returned to combat on 6 June, flying missions to reduce Axis strength on Pantelleria and striking targets on Sicily in preparation and in support of the Allied invasion of that island. The 438th was relocated to Djedeida Airfield on 26 June, and after the capture of Sicily in August it flew most of its missions against bridges, airdromes, marshalling yards, viaducts, gun sites, defensive positions, and other targets in Italy, later in support of Operation Avalanche, the Allied landings at Salerno in southwestern Italy.

In November, it moved to Sardinia, to strike Axis targets in central Italy. Early in 1944, the squadron supported Allied ground forces as they advanced in the Monte Cassino and Anzio areas. Later in the year, the group attacked German supply lines in northern Italy, bombing bridges, marshalling yards, and roads. During the summer, it bombed bridges over the Po River in northern Italy to block the stream of German supplies and reinforcements going southward. Supported Operation Dragoon, the invasion of southern France in August 1944 by attacking coastal batteries, radar stations, and bridges. From Corsica, it hit railroad bridges in Northern Italy and late in the year attacked railroad lines through the Brenner Pass that connected Germany and Austria with Italy.

In January 1945, the squadron returned to the United States, where it began to train with A-26 aircraft for operations in the Pacific Theater. Between May and July 1945, moved by ship to Okinawa, and on 16 July flew its first mission against Japan. From then until the end of the fighting in early August, the squadron attacked enemy targets such as airfields and industrial centers on Kyūshū and occupied Shanghai area of China, and shipping around the Ryukyu Islands and in the East China Sea. In November and December 1945, the squadron returned to the United States and was inactivated.

Missouri Air National Guard
The wartime 438th Bombardment Squadron was reactivated and redesignated the 180th Bombardment Squadron, and was allotted to the Air National Guard, on 24 May 1946. It was organized at Rosecrans Memorial Airport, St Joseph and was extended federal recognition on 22 August 1946.  The squadron was equipped with Douglas B-26 Invaders and was assigned to the 66th Fighter Wing at Lambert Field, St Louis.

Korean War activation

On 1 April 1951 the 180th was federalized and brought to active duty due to the Korean War. It moved to Langley Air Force Base, Virginia.  At Langley, the 180th Bombardment Squadron was assigned to the federalized 126th Bombardment Group, equipped with B-26 Invaders.  The 126th Group consisted of the 180th, along with the 108th and the 168th Bombardment Squadrons from the Illinois Air National Guard.  The aircraft were marked by various color bands on the vertical stabilizer and rudder. Black/Yellow/Blue for the 108th; Black/Yellow/Red for the 168th, and Black/Yellow/Green for the 180th.

After training and organization, the 126th Bombardment Wing was reassigned to the United States Air Forces in Europe and deployed to Bordeaux-Merignac Air Base, France with the first elements arriving in November 1951.  By 10 November, Bordeaux was considered an operational base and was assigned to the 12th Air Force.  It flew B-26's for training and maneuvers and stayed at Bordeaux AB until being transferred Laon-Couvron Air Base, France on 25 May 1952.

At Laon, the 126th used its B-26's for training and maneuvers until December until being relieved from active duty and transferred, without personnel and equipment, back to the United States where the unit was returned to the control of the Air National Guard on 1 January 1953.

Tactical Air Command
Returning to Rosecrans Airport, the 180th was reformed as a light bombardment squadron in January 1953. It received B-26 Invaders that returned from the Korean War and trained primarily in night bombardment missions, which the aircraft specialized in while in Korea.

With the removal of the B-26 from bombing duties in 1957 as neared the end of their service lives, the squadron received some Lockheed F-80C Shooting Star jet fighters and some Republic RF-84F Thunderflash reconnaissance aircraft.  They were redesignated as the 180th Fighter-Interceptor Squadron on 1 July 1957, then transferred out the F-80s and were redesignated as the 180th Tactical Reconnaissance Squadron on 10 April 1958

Air Transport
On 14 April 1962, the 180th was gained by Military Air Transport Service (MATS), trading in its Thunderflassh jet reconnaissance aircraft for 4-engined Boeing C-97 Stratofreighter transports. With air transportation recognized as a critical wartime need, the unit was redesignated the 180th Air Transport Squadron (Heavy).

With the transition to MATS, the 180th was authorized to expand to a group level, and the 139th Air Transport Group was established, the 180th becoming the group's flying squadron. Other squadrons assigned into the group were the 139th group headquarters, 139th Material Squadron (Maintenance), 139th Air Base Squadron, and the 139th USAF Dispensary.

From St. Joseph, the 180th augmented MATS airlift capability worldwide in support of the Air Force's needs.  Throughout the 1960s, the unit flew long-distance transport missions in support of Air Force requirements, frequently sending aircraft to Europe, Alaska, the Caribbean, Hawaii, Japan, the Philippines, and during the Vietnam War, to South Vietnam, Okinawa and Thailand.  With the replacement of MATS by Military Airlift Command, the squadron was redesignated the180th Military Airlift Squadron on 1 January 1966.

Air Refueling

In 1969, military requirements resulted in a change in mission when the group was reassigned from MAC transport duties to Strategic Air Command (SAC). Under SAC the group became an air refueling unit, being equipped with the air refueling version of the C-97 transport, the KC-97. Familiarity with the aircraft led to a smooth transition from MAC to the new refueling mission.  It supported the United States Air Forces in Europe flying aerial refueling missions in the KC-97 supporting missions of deploying aircraft to NATO for tactical exercises.

Tactical Airlift
In 1976 the KC-97s were retired by SAC and the unit returned to MAC as its gaining command.   The 180th was re-equipped with Lockheed C-130A Hercules tactical airlifters and returned to its transport mission.  With the C-130s the 180th supported Operation Volant Oak and Operation Coronet Oak at Howard Air Force Base, Panama.

During a 180th deployment to Howard in November 1978, they were caught up in a "real world" situation when the world began to learn of the events unfolding in Jonestown, Guyana. The 180th, flying the C-130, was the first US military aircraft landing at Timehri International Airport, Guyana with US embassy officials that they had picked up in Venezuela as well as food and supplies meant for the survivors the Americans hoped to take out of Guyana. That, of course, was before it became apparent that most of the more than 900 Peoples Temple members were lying dead in Jonestown.

In December 1989, the 180th was once again deployed at Howard when Operation Just Cause began. The 180th flew combat missions in support of the Operation. In late 1980 and through 1983, members of the 180th embarked on a special project to enhance survivability of C-130 aircrews while flying in a hostile environment. The need for this type of training became apparent after C-130 units from MAC began to participate in Red Flag exercises at Nellis Air Force Base. It was obvious that the C-130s were not doing well against the ground and air threats posed in the Red Flag exercise. After approval from the National Guard Bureau and tacitly from MAC, they began service test to validate the training program. After more than three service test, the program proved it worth and the Advanced Airlift Tactics Training Center was approved and instituted on 4 February 1984.

In March 1987, the 180th began to receive brand new C-130H2 Hercules aircraft replacing the C-130A model aircraft they had flown for the past ten years. In October 1987, the 180th deployed two C-130H2 aircraft supporting a United States Army Special Forces and the Royal Australian Special Air Service Regiment in a combined personnel airdrop exercise called Badge Anvil 1987 at RAAF Learmonth, Australia. The exercise provided high altitude low opening and high altitude high opening parachute training. Since all of the airdrops occurred above 10,000 feet and as high as 24,500 feet, the 15th Physiological Training Flight also supported the exercise and provided supplemental oxygen equipment, training and support for the training missions. Each flight was like going to the altitude chamber.

In 1989, the 180th with four C-130H2 aircraft deployed to Kimhae International Airport, Republic of Korea in support of Operation Team Spirit 1989. During the exercise, the 180th flew challenging missions including tactical resupply, fuel bladder missions, assault landings on short runways including landing on highway landing strips, numerous airdrop missions including both visual, high altitude and radar drop scenarios.

1991 Gulf War

The 180th Tactical Airlift Squadron was ordered to the active service on 28 December 1990, as a result of the Iraqi invasion of Kuwait to support Operation Desert Shield. For some unit members, this would be a return to the Persian Gulf as they had volunteered and deployed with 2 C-130H aircraft, aircrews, maintenance and support personnel, to form the first Air National Guard provisional airlift squadron in September 1990. On 2 January 1991, the 180th TAS and its 8 C-130H aircraft and personnel departed Rosecrans Air National Guard Base for Al Ain Air Base, United Arab Emirates.  Deployed elements were assigned to the 1632nd Tactical Airlift Squadron (Provisional) as part of the 1630th Tactical Airlift Wing (Provisional) which was under the 1610th Airlift Division (Provisional). The unit remained at Al Ain Air Base through the air war and the ground war flying combat and combat support missions in support of the allied operations. Beginning on 22 March 1991, the 180th redeployed to Al Kharj Air Base, Kingdom of Saudi Arabia. The 180th departed Al Kharj Air Base on 28 May 1991, and returned to Rosecrans Air National Guard Base on 30 May 1991. The 180th was relieved from active duty and released back to state control on 24 June 1991.

During the 1990s, the 180th provided airlift support to the United States Air Forces Europe during the airlift operations into Bosnia and Herzegovina. These operations were named Operation Provide Promise, Operation Joint Endeavor, Operation Joint Guard and Operation Joint Forge. Members of the 180th along with operations support and maintenance personnel would deploy to Rhein-Main Air Base and, after it closed, to Ramstein Air Base and assigned to "Delta Squadron". The Air National Guard would generally be responsible for a 90- or 120-day period and guard members would typically volunteer for duty for a minimum of a two- to three-week period although some would volunteer for longer periods. Deployed elements were assigned to the 1630th Tactical Airlift Wing (Provisional), 28 December 1990 – 24 June 1991 : Elements operated from: Al Ain International Airport, Al Ain, United Arab Emirates, 28 December 1990 – 24 June 1991

Global War on Terrorism
Following the attacks on 11 September 2001, the 180th served in a support role flying missions transporting personnel and equipment in support of Operation Enduring Freedom.

The 180th Airlift Squadron was notified in February 2003 that it would be partially mobilized as a result of the impending conflict in Iraq which would later be known as Operation Iraqi Freedom. The unit deployed in March 2003 to the Iraqi theater and later supported Operation Enduring Freedom in Afghanistan and was released from active duty in March 2006 and reverted to state control. This was a historic partial mobilization that lasted three years.   The 180th remained in a state of partial activation for three years until it was released from mobilization in March 2006 and reverted to state control.

Lineage
 180th Military Airlift Squadron
 Constituted as the 438th Bombardment Squadron (Medium) on 19 June 1942
 Activated on 26 June 1942
 Redesignated 438th Bombardment Squadron, Medium c. 1944
 Redesignated 438th Bombardment Squadron, Light on 3 February 1945
 Inactivated on 13 December 1945
 Redesignated 180th Bombardment Squadron, Light and allotted to the National Guard on 24 May 1946
 Activated on 21 June 1946
 Extended federal recognition on 22 August 1946
 Federalized and placed on active duty on 1 April 1951
 Inactivated and returned to Missouri state control on 1 January 1953
 Activated on 1 January 1953
 Redesignated 180th Bombardment Squadron, Tactical c. 1955
 Redesignated 180th Fighter-Interceptor Squadron on 15 June 1957
 Redesignated 180th Tactical Reconnaissance Squadron, Photographic, Jet on 10 April 1958
 Redesignated 180th Air Transport Squadron, Heavy on 14 April 1962
 Redesignated 180th Military Airlift Squadron on 1 January 1966
 Inactivated on 5 September 1969
 Consolidated with 180th Airlift Squadron on 31 May 1991

 180th Airlift Squadron
 Constituted as the 180th Air Refueling Squadron, c. 1969
 Activated on 5 September 1969
 Redesignated 180th Tactical Airlift Squadron on 16 October 1976
 Federalized and placed on active duty on 28 December 1990
 Consolidated with 180th Military Airlift Squadron on 31 May 1991
 Released from active duty and returned to Missouri state control on 24 June 1991
 Redesignated 180th Airlift Squadron on 1 June 1992

Assignments
 319th Bombardment Group, 26 June 1942 – 13 December 1945
 Missouri National Guard, 21 June 1946
 66th Fighter Wing, June 1946
 126th Bombardment Group, February 1947
 131st Composite Group, 1 November 1950
 126th Bombardment Group, 1 February 1951 – 1 January 1953
 140th Fighter-Bomber Group, 1 January 1953
 131st Bombardment Group (later 131st Fighter-Interceptor Group), March 1953
 118th Tactical Reconnaissance Group, 10 April 1958
 139th Air Transport Group (later 139th Military Airlift Group), 14 April 1962
 139th Air Refueling Group (later 139th Tactical Airlift Group, 139th Airlift Group), 5 September 1969
 139th Operations Group, 1 October 1995 – present

Stations

 Barksdale Field, Louisiana, 26 June 1942
 Harding Army Air Field, Louisiana, 8–27 August 1942
 RAF Shipdham (AAF-115), England, 12 September 1942
 RAF Horsham St Faith (AAF-123), England, 5–21 October 1942
 Saint-Leu Airfield, Algeria, c. 10 November 1942
 Oran Tafaraoui Airport, Algeria, 17 November 1942
 Maison Blanche Airport, Algeria, c. 26 November 1942
 Telergma Airfield, Algeria, 13 December 1942
 Oujda Airfield, French Morocco, 3 March 1943
 Rabat-Salé Airport, French Morocco, 25 April 1943
 Sedrata Airfield, Algeria, 1 June 1943
 Djedeida Airfield, Tunisia, 26 June 1943
 Decimomannu Airfield, Sardinia, Italy, 1 November 1943
 Serragia Airfield, Corsica, France, 22 September 1944 – c. 9 January 1945
 Bradley Field, Connecticut, 25 January 1945

 Columbia Army Air Base, South Carolina, 28 February – 28 April 1945
 Kadena Airfield, Okinawa, 3 July 1945
 Machinato-Naha Airfield, Okinawa, 21 July – 23 November 1945
 Vancouver Barracks, Washington, c. 11–13 December 1945
 Rosecrans Memorial Airport, Missouri, 22 August 1946
 Langley Air Force Base, Virginia, 1 April –  1 November 1951
 Bordeaux-Merignac Air Base, France 1 November 1951 – 25 May 1952
 Laon-Couvron Air Base, France, 25 May 1952 – 31 December 1952
 Rosecrans Memorial Airport (later Rosecrans Air National Guard Base), Missouri, 1 January 1953

Aircraft

 Martin B-26 Marauder, 1942 – 1944
 North American B-25 Mitchell, 1944 – 1945
 Douglas A-26 (later B-26) Invader, 1945 – 1946, 1946 – 1957
 Lockheed F-80C Shooting Star, 1957 – 1958

 Republic RF-84F Thunderflash, 1958 – 1961
 Boeing C-97 Stratofreighter, 1961 – 1968
 Boeing KC-97 Stratofreighter, 1968 – 1976
 Lockheed C-130A Hercules, 1976 – 1987
 Lockheed C-130H2 Hercules, 1987 – present

See also

 List of United States Air Force installations
 Advanced Airlift Tactics Training Center

References

Notes
 Explanatory notes

 Citations

Bibliography 

 Gross, Charles J (1996), The Air National Guard and the American Military Tradition, United States Dept. of Defense,

External links
 126th Bombardment Wing (Light)

Squadrons of the United States Air National Guard
Military units and formations in Missouri
180